The 2005–2006 Israeli Basketball Super League season was the 52nd season of top division basketball in Israel.

Regular season

Standings 

Source: Official Ligat HaAl website
Pts=Points, P=Matches played, W=Matches won, L=Matches lost, F=Points for, A=Points against, D=Points difference.

Final four

Awards

Regular season MVP 
  Timmy Bowers (Maccabi Giv'at Shmuel)

First team 
  Timmy Bowers (Maccabi Giv'at Shmuel)
  Or Eitan (Maccabi Rishon LeZion)
  Omar Sneed (Maccabi Rishon LeZion)
  Lior Eliyahu (Hapoel Galil Elyon)
  Mario Austin (Hapoel Jerusalem)

Coach of the season 
  Ofer Berkowitz (Maccabi Giv'at Shmuel)

Israeli MVP 
  Lior Eliyahu (Hapoel Galil Elyon)

Rising star 
  Yuval Naimi (Maccabi Giv'at Shmuel)

Individual statistical awards 
 Top scorer –  Marcus Hatten (Hapoel Tel Aviv) (23 Per game)
 Top Rebounder –  Ousmane Cisse (Bnei Hasharon) (10)
 Top Assists –  Meir Tapiro (Hapoel Jerusalem) (5.4)
 Top Steals –  Roi Berkowitz (Hapoel Ramat Hasharon) (2.7

Israeli Basketball Premier League seasons
Israeli
League